Guyana competed at the 2018 Commonwealth Games in the Gold Coast, Australia from April 4 to April 15, 2018. It was Guyana's 18th appearance at the Commonwealth Games.

Medalists

Competitors
The following is the list of number of competitors participating at the Games per sport/discipline.

Athletics (track and field)

Guyana's track and field team consisted of six athletes (four male and two female).

Men
Track & road events

Field events

Women
Field events

Badminton

Guyana participated with one athlete (one man).

Boxing

Guyana participated with a team of 2 athletes (2 men)

Men

Shooting

Guyana participated with 2 athletes (2 men).

Open

Squash

Guyana participated with 4 athletes (2 men and 2 women).

Individual

Doubles

Swimming

Guyana's swimming team consisted of two swimmers: one male and one female.

Table tennis

Guyana participated with 6 athletes (3 men and 3 women).

Singles

Doubles

Team

References

Nations at the 2018 Commonwealth Games
Guyana at the Commonwealth Games
2018 in Guyanese sport